HMS Comet, a wood-hulled paddle tug completed in 1822, was the first steam ship built for the Royal Navy.

Comet was built at the yards in Deptford by Boulton, Watt & Co, which was at the time just outside London, in 1822. She was ordered as a tug, for towing ships out of harbour when the wind was not enough to allow them to move by themselves, specifically "to be employed in towing HM ships in the Thames and Medway". The ship was designed by Oliver Lang, the master shipwright at Woolwich Dockyard. She was fitted with a two-mast schooner rig, as well as a twin cylinder side-lever engine, which produced 80 nominal horsepower.

Humphry Davy travelled on the Comet to Norway to test his zinc protectors for ships' copper bottoms in the summer of 1824.

On 10 December 1868 Comet was ordered to be broken up in Portsmouth Dockyard.

References 

Ships of the Royal Navy
Tugboats of the United Kingdom
Paddle steamers of the United Kingdom
1822 ships